Maung Gyi is a Burmese martial artist who introduced Bando into the U.S.

Maung Gyi may also refer to:
 Maung Gyee, Burmese politician and diplomat
 Maung Maung Gyi, Burmese watercolor painter
 Joseph Augustus Maung Gyi, acting Governor of British Burma in 1930–1931
 Ledi Pandita U Maung Gyi, Burmese writer